Saar–Nahe Basin is a molasse basin in southwest Germany. The basin is located south of the Hunsrück mountains  between the rivers Nahe and the Saar.   The aggregation of sediments in the basin started in the late Carboniferous and Early Permian as part of the Variscan orogeny.

See also 
 Saar-Nahe Hills

Further reading

Structural geology
Sedimentology
Geology of Germany
Basins of Europe